Laurel Prieb, the husband of Wendy Selig-Prieb, son-in-law of former Major League Baseball commissioner Bud Selig,  was until recently the Vice President of Corporate Affairs for the Milwaukee Brewers. Shortly after the 2005 sale of the Brewers to Los Angeles investor Mark Attanasio, Prieb became Vice President for Western Operations and Special Projects for Major League Baseball. Prieb started his baseball career as the Traveling Secretary with the Minnesota Twins and remained in that position until working for the Brewers.

Prieb and his wife, Wendy Selig-Prieb, have one daughter together, Natalie.

References

Milwaukee Brewers executives
Major League Baseball executives
Living people
Year of birth missing (living people)